Lasionycta conjugata is a moth of the family Noctuidae. It is found in the Rocky Mountains from central Utah and Colorado north to the Beartooth Plateau on the Montana-Wyoming border.

It is found in subalpine forests and is nocturnal.

Adults are on wing from early July to late August.

External links
A Revision of Lasionycta Aurivillius (Lepidoptera, Noctuidae) for North America and notes on Eurasian species, with descriptions of 17 new species, 6 new subspecies, a new genus, and two new species of Tricholita Grote

Lasionycta
Moths of North America
Moths described in 1899